Marialite is a silicate mineral with a chemical formula of  if a pure endmember or  with increasing meionite content. Marialite is a member of the scapolite group and a solid solution exists between marialite and meionite, the calcium endmember. It is a rare mineral usually used as a collector's stone.

Crystallography
Marialite has tetragonal crystallography and a 4/m crystal class. It has a 4 fold rotation with 90° mirror planes. Crystals are usually prismatic with prominent forms of prisms and dipyramids.

Marialite belongs to a uniaxial negative optical class which means it has one circular section and a principal section shaped like an oblate sphenoid.

Discovery and occurrence
Marialite was first described in 1866 for an occurrence in the Phlegrean Volcanic complex, Campania, Italy. It was named by German mineralogist Gerhard vom Rath for his wife, Maria Rosa vom Rath.

Marialite occurs in regional and contact metamorphism: marble, calcareous gneiss, granulite and greenschist. It also occurs in skarn, pegmatite and hydrothermally altered volcanic rocks. This means that Marialite is formed in high pressure and/or high temperature environments.

References

Tectosilicates
Halide minerals
Tetragonal minerals
Minerals in space group 87
Sodium minerals
Aluminium minerals